Satish Chander Dhawan Government College, formally S.C.D. Government College, Ludhiana, formerly Imperial College, Ludhiana and Government College for Boys, Ludhiana, is an educational institution located in Ludhiana, Punjab, India. The college offers various courses in Humanities, Commerce and Science for graduation and post graduation level studies.

History
S.C.D. Government College was established in 1920 as Imperial College, Ludhiana and was later renamed Government College for Boys, Ludhiana. In 1976 it was renamed  S.C.D. Government College by the Government of Punjab after Satish Dhawan, an alumnus of the college.

Notable alumni

 Arshpreet Bhullar, basketball player 
 Satish Dhawan, space scientist
 Sahir Ludhianvi, Urdu poet

References

External links
 

Education in Ludhiana
Educational institutions established in 1920
Universities and colleges in Punjab, India
1920 establishments in British India